The term Hystricomorpha (from Greek ὕστριξ, hystrix 'porcupine' and Greek μορφή, morphē 'form') has had many definitions throughout its history. In the broadest sense, it refers to any rodent (except dipodoids) with a hystricomorphous zygomasseteric system. This includes the Hystricognathi, Ctenodactylidae, Anomaluridae, and Pedetidae. Molecular and morphological results suggest the inclusion of the Anomaluridae and Pedetidae in Hystricomorpha may be suspect.

Classification

The modern definition of Hystricomorpha, also known as Entodacrya or Ctenohystrica, is a taxonomic hypothesis uniting the gundis with the hystricognath rodents. Considerable morphological and strong molecular support exists for this relationship. If true, this hypothesis renders the traditional view of Sciurognathi invalid, as it becomes a paraphyletic group.

The hystricomorph rodents, or at least members of Caviomorpha, are sometimes not regarded as rodents. Most molecular and genetic research, however, confirms the monophyly of rodents. Support for rodent polyphyly appears to be a product of long branch attraction.

Hystricomorph rodents appeared in South America in the Eocene, a continent which previously had metatherians, xenarthrans, and meridiungulates as the only resident nonflying mammals. They apparently arrived by rafting across the Atlantic from Africa. The same type of migration may have occurred with primates, which also appeared in South America in the Eocene when it was an isolated continent, long before the Great American Interchange. All of this is still controversial, and new scientific discoveries on this subject are published regularly.

Families
The symbol "†" is used to indicate extinct groups.

 Suborder Hystricomorpha
 Superfamily Ctenodactyloidea
 †Chapattimyidae
 Ctenodactylidae - gundis
 Diatomyidae - Laotian rock rat
 †Tamquammyidae
 †Yuomyidae
 Hystricognathiformes
 †Tsaganomyidae
 Hystricognathi - true hystricognaths
 †Baluchimyinae
 Phiomorpha
 Bathyergidae - blesmols
 †Bathyergoididae
 †Diamantomyidae
 Hystricidae - Old World porcupines
 †Kenyamyidae
 †Myophiomyidae
 Petromuridae - dassie rat
 †Phiomyidae
 Thryonomyidae - cane rats
 Caviomorpha - New World hystricognaths
 Superfamily Cavioidea
 Caviidae - cavies, capybaras, and guinea pigs
 †Cephalomyidae
 Cuniculidae - pacas
 Dasyproctidae - agoutis and acouchis
 Dinomyidae - pacarana
 †Eocardiidae
 †Neoepiblemidae
 Superfamily Chinchilloidea
 Abrocomidae - chinchilla rats
 Chinchillidae - chinchillas and viscachas
 Superfamily Erethizontoidea
 Erethizontidae - New World porcupines
 Superfamily Octodontoidea
 Capromyidae - hutias
 Ctenomyidae - tuco-tucos
 Echimyidae - spiny rats
 †Heptaxodontidae - giant hutias
 Myocastoridae - nutria
 Octodontidae - degus and relatives

Citations

General references 

 
 
 
 
 
 
 
 
 
 
 
 
 
 
 
 

Extant Eocene first appearances
Mammal suborders
Rodent taxonomy

th:เม่น